Epsilon Telescopii, Latinized from ε Telescopii, is a solitary, orange-hued star in the southern constellation of Telescopium. It is visible to the naked eye with an apparent visual magnitude of +4.53. Based upon an annual parallax shift of 7.80 mas as seen from Earth, it is located roughly 410 light years from the Sun, give or take 20 light years.

This an evolved K-type giant with a stellar classification of K0 III. It displays an infrared excess, suggesting the presence of an orbiting disk of dust. The star is radiating 293 times the Sun's luminosity from its photosphere at an effective temperature of 4,996 K. It has a 13th magnitude optical companion at an angular separation of 16.30 arcseconds along a position angle of 233°, as of 2000.

References

K-type giants
Telescopii, Epsilon
Telescopium (constellation)
166063
089912
6783
Durchmusterung objects